Leonid Barats is a Russian actor, screenwriter and film producer. Merited Artist of the Russian Federation.

Selected filmography

References

External links 
 Leonid Barats on kino-teatr.ru

1971 births
Living people
Russian male film actors
Jewish Russian comedians
Jewish Russian actors
21st-century Russian male actors
Russian activists against the 2022 Russian invasion of Ukraine